Federico Mordegan (born 1 February 1970 in Vicenza, Italy) is a former professional tennis player from Italy.

Mordegan enjoyed most of his tennis success while playing doubles. During his career, he won one doubles title. He achieved a career-high doubles ranking of World No. 70 in 1995.

ATP career finals

Doubles: 6 (1 title, 5 runner-ups)

ATP Challenger and ITF Futures finals

Singles: 1 (0–1)

Doubles: 13 (6–7)

External links
 
 

Italian male tennis players
Sportspeople from Vicenza
Living people
1970 births
20th-century Italian people